Comptaluta is an extinct genus of Cambrian bradoriid arthropod. The genus was erected by Armin Öpik, who described C. calcarata and C. profunda from the Ordian of Australia. Two further species have been described from the Chengjiang biota: C. kailiensis and C. inflata.

See also

 Cambrian explosion
 List of Chengjiang Biota species by phylum

References

Cambrian animals
Maotianshan shales fossils
Prehistoric arthropod genera
Cambrian genus extinctions